Painsec is an unincorporated community in Westmorland County, New Brunswick. The community is situated in Southeastern New Brunswick, to the east of Moncton.  This community is partially located within the city of Dieppe.  Painsec is part of Greater Moncton, and part of the Local Service District of Greater Lakeburn.

History

Notable people

See also
List of communities in New Brunswick

Bordering communities

References

Communities in Westmorland County, New Brunswick
Communities in Greater Moncton